MV Malibu is a  motor yacht built in 1926. She was designed by Ted Geary and built by N. J. Blanchard Boat Co., Seattle, Washington.

Construction is of Douglas Fir sawn frames on  centers, planked with  Port Orford yellow cedar.

History
Malibu was originally built for the Adamson and Rindge families of Malibu, California. Rhoda May Knight Rindge and daughter Rhoda Adamson commissioned the yacht in 1925 and owned her until 1937.

Her third owner, Thomas F. Hamilton developed a resort in British Columbia, Canada, named 'Malibu Camp' (Malibu, British Columbia). The camp is now owned and operated by Young Life. The 'Malibu Rapids' navigation channel at the entrance to Princess Louisa Inlet, near Malibu Camp, is also named after the yacht.

Malibu was purchased by Wells McCurdy in 1973 and reconfigured with raised wheelhouse and other arrangement changes.

On July 3, 2002, Malibu sank after running into a rock in the San Juan Islands of Washington State. There were no injuries, but the yacht had to be extensively rebuilt and was re-launched at Seattle's Foss Shipyard in 2003.

Currently owned by John Jacobi of Seattle, Washington, who has owned her since 1999. Malibu is also designated as a City of Seattle Historic Landmark.

References

External links
 
Classic Yacht Association > Malibu
Historic Adamson House & Malibu Lagoon Museum Records

Motor yachts